Akgul Amanmuradova and Chuang Chia-jung were the defending champions but Amanmuradova decided not to participate.
Chuang played alongside Chang Kai-chen, but they lost in the quarterfinals to Natalie Grandin and Vladimíra Uhlířová.
Olga Govortsova and Klaudia Jans-Ignacik won the tournament defeating Natalie Grandin and Vladimíra Uhlířová 6–7(4–7), 6–3, [10–3] in the final.

Seeds

Draw

Draw

References
 Main Draw

Internationaux de Strasbourg - Doubles
2012 Doubles
2012 in French tennis